Pruninae is a taxonomic subfamily within the larger family of Marginellidae, a group of small sea snails, marine gastropod molluscs in the superfamily Volutoidea.

Genera
 Balanetta Jousseaume, 1875
 Bullata Jousseaume, 1875
 Closia Gray, 1857
 Cryptospira Hinds, 1844
 Hyalina Schumacher, 1817
 Mirpurina Ortea, Moro & Espinosa, 2019
 Prunum Herrmannsen, 1852
 Rivomarginella Brandt, 1968
Genera brought into synonymy
 Egouana: synonym of Egouena Jousseaume, 1875: synonym of Prunum Herrmannsen, 1852 (invalid: incorrect alternative original spelling)
 Egouena Jousseaume, 1875: synonym of Prunum Herrmannsen, 1852
 Gibberulina Monterosato, 1884: synonym of Bullata Jousseaume, 1875
 Leptegouana Woodring, 1928: synonym of Prunum Herrmannsen, 1852
 Porcellanella Conrad, 1863 †: synonym of Prunum Herrmannsen, 1852 ( invalid: junior homonym of Porcellanella White, 1852 [Crustacea].)
 Volutella Swainson, 1831: synonym of Bullata Jousseaume, 1875 (invalid: junior homonym of Volutella Perry, 1810 [Vasidae])

References

External links
 A.E., Caballer Gutierrez M., Buge B., Sorokin P.V., Puillandre N., Bouchet P. (2019 [20 September]). Mapping the missing branch on the neogastropod tree of life: molecular phylogeny of marginelliform gastropods. Journal of Molluscan Studies.

Marginellidae